Sun was launched at Sunderland in 1832 and was lost in 1836. 

Sun first appeared in Lloyd's Register (LR) in 1834.

Her crew abandoned Sun on 20 July 1836 off Cape Sable Island, Nova Scotia. She was on a voyage from Quebec City to Gloucester. Her entry in the LR volume for 1836 carried the annotation "Abandoned" underneath her name.

Citations

1832 ships
Ships built on the River Wear
Age of Sail merchant ships of England
Maritime incidents in July 1836